John Richardson House is a historic home located at Lancaster in Erie County, New York.  It is a locally significant and distinct example of the vernacular interpretation of Italianate style.  It was built about 1840 by John Richardson, a local brickmaker and builder.

It was listed on the National Register of Historic Places in 1999. It is located in the Broadway Historic District.

References

External links
Richardson, John, House - U.S. National Register of Historic Places on Waymarking.com

Houses on the National Register of Historic Places in New York (state)
Italianate architecture in New York (state)
Houses completed in 1840
Houses in Erie County, New York
National Register of Historic Places in Erie County, New York
Historic district contributing properties in Erie County, New York